Ladipo Eso popularly known as Ladipoe or Poe is a Nigerian Rapper & musician. On 28 February 2017, Ladipoe signed a record deal with Mavin Records. He rose to prominence with the song "Feel Alright" where he got featured by SDC "Show Dem Camp". He also released a new single "Jaiye" in March 2019 before dropping the hit song, "Know You" featuring Nigerian Joromi singer, Simi. He is also a member of the Nigerian supergroup Collectiv3.

Early life and education
Ladipoe was born and raised in Lagos. He attended the University of North Carolina at Pembroke majoring in both Biology & Chemistry. It was there he got into music and co-founded the group Lyrically Equipped with his friends Jeffrey and Kurt. He was then signed to Mavin Records by Don Jazzy in 2017.

Career
Poe was the first rapper to be signed to Mavin Records since re-branding in 2012 from Mo'Hits. Poe recorded his first single under the label "Man Already" produced by Altims. Poe is inspired by the Slum Village, Lupe and Little Brother.

His 2021 single, "Feeling" which featured Bnxn peaked at number one of the TurnTable Top 50 chart on 3 occasions. He performed "Feeling" at the opening show of the sixth season of Big Brother Naija. The song, “Feeling” became a hit, it even hit the clubs in South Africa and is still people's favorite African song on the internet right now.

When asked in November 2021, how he grew his music career in an environment rap music is less appreciated, Ladipoe told The Guardian Nigeria, that he was told when he began his musical journey that rapping had lost meaning in Nigeria that was when he released ‘Feeling,’ a song he featured Buju. the singer has continued to reflect on his struggles in the music industry, even as he continues attributes his success to his prayers to God.

Discography

Singles 
"Know you"  (2020)
"Rap Messiah" (2021)
"Feeling"  (2021)
"Big Energy" (2022)

Albums 
Talk About Poe (2019)

Providence EP (2021)

Awards and nominations

See also
List of Nigerian rappers

References 

Year of birth missing (living people)
Living people
Rappers from Lagos